Clifton B. Newman (born November 7, 1951) is an American attorney and at-large judge of the South Carolina Circuit Court. He has served as a judge since his election by the state's general assembly in 2000. In 2021, he was reelected to a final fourth term. In his role as a circuit court judge he has presided over several high profile trials, including the trials of Michael Slager, Nathaniel Rowland, and Alex Murdaugh.

Early life 
Newman was born in Kingstree, South Carolina, on November 7, 1951, to his parents Reverend Dr. Marion L. Newman, Sr. and Alice Singleton Newman. Newman was the first member of his family to be born in a hospital. When Newman was three years old, his mother left his family in Greeleyville, South Carolina to work in New York as a domestic worker. 

In high school, Newman acted as an attorney in a dramatization of Briggs v. Elliott, a precursor to the landmark Brown v. Board of Education. Newman graduated from the then segregated high school, Williamsburg County Training School, as valedictorian in 1969 and attended Cleveland State University, where he served as president of the student government. He received his Juris Doctor from Cleveland-Marshall College of Law.

Legal career

Attorney and assistant solicitor 
After completing law school, Newman began his legal career in Cleveland, Ohio by forming a partnership known as Belcher & Newman in 1976. In 1982, Newman returned to South Carolina and opened a private practice with offices in Columbia and Manning. He relocated his office to his hometown of Kingstree shortly thereafter. His law partner in this practice was Ronnie A. Sabb. In July 1983, he was appointed as assistant solicitor for Williamsburg County.

During his time as a private practice attorney and solicitor, Newman handled litigation in hundreds of cases involving personal injury, wrongful death, and medical malpractice. In his role as assistant solicitor, Newman litigated approximately ten murder cases, four of which involved the death penalty.

Newman was the prosecutor in a murder trial during which the defendant, Casey Lewis, attacked his own counsel and a deputy with homemade shanks. After Newman successfully argued against a mistrial, Lewis pleaded guilty and was sentenced to 55 years in prison.

Circuit court judge 
In 2000, the South Carolina General Assembly unanimously elected Newman to circuit court judge at-large seat three, as the other candidates withdrew their candidacy. Newman has been re-elected to this seat by acclamation three times. This is his last term because South Carolina law requires that judges retire in the same calendar year as their 72nd birthday. As a judge, Newman has overseen several high profile cases.

His first capital case, involved Mikal Mahdi, a defendant accused of killing a public safety officer and then burning the victim's body. In this case, the defendant pled guilty and Newman retained responsibility for issuing the sentence. In his sentencing, he noted that Mahdi showed no remorse and lacked humanity. Newman issued the death penalty and later remarked this sentencing was difficult for him because he did not agree with the death penalty.

In 2015, he was the judge in the state trial of Michael Slager, the police officer accused in the killing of Walter Scott which resulted in a mistrial. He made the controversial decision to release Slager on a  bond. In this trial, he selected the single Black juror as the foreman.

In 2018, Newman ordered that a grand jury report detailing corruption in South Carolina's General Assembly be released to the public.

In 2021, Newman presided over the trial of Nathaniel Rowland, the defendant in the state's case related to the murder of Samantha Josephson. Rowland was convicted and Newman issued a life sentence, noting that all of the evidence the state presented pointed to him.

On September 28, 2021, South Carolina Supreme Court Chief Justice Donald W. Beatty issued an order assigning Newman jurisdiction in "criminal investigations concerning Richard Alexander Murdaugh" and "all pending and future criminal investigations concerning the deaths of Margaret Kennedy Branstetter Murdaugh, Paul Terry Murdaugh, Gloria Harriott Satterfield, and Stephen Nicholas Smith, including any criminal charges which may hereafter be brought by law enforcement or the prosecutor assigned to these matters." In the murder trial of Alex Murdaugh, Newman denied a pre-trial joint motion request to seal proceedings stating that "the public is entitled to know how justice is being administered". 

After the verdict was read by Judge Newman, he denied a defense motion for a mistrial by saying "The evidence of guilt is overwhelming". He later told the jurors "The circumstantial evidence, direct evidence — all of the evidence pointed to one conclusion, and that’s the conclusion that you all reached." Newman later added that the jury had come to a "proper conclusion as they saw the law and facts". Newman sentenced Murdaugh to two life sentences without the possibility of parole.

Newman has helped to facilitate the careers of African American lawyers and judges.

Personal life 
Newman resides in Columbia, South Carolina, with his wife Patricia. Together, they have four children. Newman's daughter Jocelyn Newman is also a circuit court judge. Newman's son, Brian DeQuincey Newman was the youngest serving Columbia city councilman until his death (cardiac arrest) on January 3, 2023. 

Newman is the nephew of civil rights activist Isaiah DeQuincey Newman. He attends a local Methodist Church where he is chairperson of the administrative council. As a hobby, he enjoys restoring houses and has received historical preservation awards for this work.

References

External links 
Judge Clifton Newman Profile: Murdaugh Trial on Post and Courier
Key Players in Murdaugh Trial on Post and Courier

1951 births
Living people
20th-century African-American people
20th-century American judges
21st-century American judges
African-American judges
African-American lawyers
African-American Methodists
Cleveland–Marshall College of Law alumni
Cleveland State University alumni
People from Kingstree, South Carolina
People from Williamsburg County, South Carolina
South Carolina state court judges